The M3 Music Card from the Chinese company Meizu, is a Flash-based MP3 player that allows users to play MP3, WMA, WAV, FLAC and OGG audio files. The player is also capable of video playback at 25FPS on its 1.5-inch screen. Also included is an FM tuner, voice recorder, calendar, stopwatch, calculator, and games. The M3 weighs in at 42 grams, 11 grams lighter than its bigger sibling, the M6 Mini Player.

The shiny metal back of the older M6 Mini Players is gone – the M3 comes with a smooth black metal finish on the back cover. According to the manufacturer, the player has around 20 hours of battery life with regular use.

The player costs 499/599/850 CNY (65/80/110 USD) for the 2/4/8 GB models respectively.

There have been rumors since late spring 2007 that a slightly modified M3 (shorter body, smaller battery, brushed metal finish, modified back/forward button) will be presented. In August 2007 information was available that the presentation of the new M3SE will be postponed due to Meizu's focus on the new 'M8 MiniOne' and the M6 second edition.

See also
Meizu

Portable media players
Audiovisual introductions in 2007